High Risk Books was a book publisher, founded in New York City in 1993 as an imprint of Serpent's Tail Press of London. It was started by Ira Silverberg and Amy Scholder who was then an editor at City Lights Books in San Francisco. Its titles were designed by Rex Ray.

High Risk Books was dedicated to publishing innovative, provocative, and progressive literature. The publishing firm was united by its concern for certain subversive impulses, and in this spirit printed authors as diverse as William S. Burroughs, Tim Dlugos, Kathy Acker, Diamanda Galas, Gary Indiana, June Jordan, Cookie Mueller, Lynne Tillman, John Giorno, Pagan Kennedy, Sapphire, Jayne Cortez, and many others. As a small press, High Risk played an important role in providing a space for many emerging writers who would otherwise have found it difficult to get published in mainstream, large houses. 

High Risk Books ceased operation in January 1997 because of disagreements with Serpent's Tail in London, although books bearing the High Risk logo continued to be published through Serpent's Tail until 2002.

References 

Book publishing companies based in New York (state)
Publishing companies established in 1993